The Fox Broadcasting Company (Fox) is an American broadcast television network owned by Fox Corporation which was launched in October 1986. The network currently has 18 owned-and-operated stations, and current affiliation agreements with 227 other television stations.

This article is a listing of current Fox affiliates in the continental United States and U.S. possessions (including subchannel affiliates, satellite stations and select low-power translators), arranged alphabetically by state, and based on the station's city of license and followed in parentheses by the Designated Market Area if it differs from the city of license. Also included is a listing of Fox-branded cable channels outside the United States. There are links to and articles on each of the broadcast stations and international channels, describing their histories, local programming and technical information, such as broadcast frequencies.

The station's advertised channel number follows the call letters. In most cases, this is their virtual channel (PSIP) number.

Stations listed in boldface are owned and operated by Fox through its subsidiary Fox Television Stations (excluding owned-and-operated stations of MyNetworkTV, unless the station simulcasts a co-owned Fox O&O station via a digital subchannel).

United States

Alabama
 Birmingham – WBRC 6
 Huntsville – WZDX 54
 Mobile – WALA-TV 10
 Montgomery – WCOV-TV 20
 Ozark (Dothan) – WDFX-TV 34

Alaska
Some Fox programming is broadcast on the Alaska Rural Communications Service (ARCS).
 Anchorage – KTBY 4
 Fairbanks – KATN-DT2 2.2
 Juneau – KJUD-DT3 8.3

Arizona
 Phoenix – KSAZ-TV 10 
 Tucson – KMSB 11

Arkansas
 Fort Smith – KFTA 24
 Jonesboro – KJNB 39 / KJNE-LD 42
 Little Rock – KLRT 16

California
 Bakersfield – KBFX-CD 58
 El Centro (Yuma, Arizona) – KECY-TV 9
 Eureka – KBVU 28
 Indio (Palm Springs) – KDFX-CD 33
 Los Angeles – KTTV 11
 Monterey – KION-DT2 46.2
 San Francisco – KTVU 2
 Paradise (Chico) – KCVU-TV 20
 Sacramento – KTXL 40
 San Diego – KSWB-TV 69
 Santa Barbara  – KKFX-CD 24
 Visalia (Fresno) – KMPH-TV 26

Colorado
 Colorado Springs – KXRM-TV 21
 Denver – KDVR 31
 Durango − KREZ-DT2 6.2 (satellite of KRQE-DT2, Albuquerque, New Mexico)
 Fort Collins – KFCT 22 (satellite of KDVR)
 Grand Junction – KFQX 4

Connecticut
 Hartford – WTIC-TV 61

Delaware
 None; served by WTXF-TV Philadelphia and WBOC-DT2 Salisbury, MD

District of Columbia
 Washington, D.C. – WTTG 5

Florida
 Cape Coral (Fort Myers) – WFTX 36
 Jacksonville – WFOX-TV 30
 Miami – WSVN 7
 Ocala (Gainesville) – WOGX 51 (semi-satellite of WOFL)
 Orlando – WOFL 35
 Panama City – WPGX 28
 Tallahassee – WTWC-DT2 40.2
 Tampa – WTVT 13
 West Palm Beach – WFLX 29

Georgia 
 Albany – WFXL 31
 Atlanta – WAGA-TV 5
 Augusta – WFXG 54
 Columbus – WXTX 54
 Macon – WGXA 24

Hawaii
 Hilo – KHAW-TV 11 (satellite of KHON-TV)
 Honolulu – KHON-TV 2
 Wailuku – KAII-TV 7 (satellite of KHON-TV)

Idaho
 Caldwell (Boise) – KNIN-TV 9 
 Pocatello (Idaho Falls) – KXPI-LD 24.1
 Twin Falls – KSVT-LD 14

Illinois
 Bloomington (Peoria) – WYZZ-TV 43
 Chicago – WFLD 32
 Quincy –  WGEM-DT3 10.3
 Rockford – WQRF-TV 39
 Springfield – WRSP-TV 55
 Urbana (Champaign) – WCCU 27 (satellite of WRSP-TV)

Indiana
 South Bend – WSBT-TV 22.2
 Evansville – WEVV-DT2 44.2 / WEEV-LD 47.1
 Fort Wayne – WFFT-TV 55
 Indianapolis – WXIN 59
 Lafayette - WPBI-LD 16
 Terre Haute – WTHI-DT2 10.2

Iowa
 Cedar Rapids – KGAN 2.2
 Davenport – KLJB 18
 Des Moines – KDSM-TV 17
 Ottumwa – KYOU-TV 15
 Sioux City – KPTH 44

Kansas
 Garden City – KAAS-LP 31 (satellite of KSAS-TV)
 Hoisington (Great Bend) – KOCW 14 (satellite of KSAS-TV)
 Pittsburg (Joplin, Missouri) – KFJX 14
 Salina – KAAS-TV 17 (satellite of KSAS-TV)
 Topeka – KTMJ-CD 43
 Wichita – KSAS-TV 24

Kentucky
 Bowling Green – WBKO-DT2 13.2
 Danville (Lexington) – WDKY-TV 56
 Louisville – WDRB 41
 Newport (Cincinnati, Ohio) – WXIX-TV 19

Louisiana 
 Baton Rouge – WGMB-TV 44
 Lafayette – KADN-TV 15
 Lake Charles – KVHP 29
 New Orleans – WVUE-DT 8
 Shreveport – KMSS-TV 33
 West Monroe (Monroe) – KARD 14

Maine
 Bangor – WFVX-LD 22 / WVII-DT2 7.2
 Presque Isle – WAGM-DT2 8.2
 Waterville (Portland) – WPFO 23

Maryland
 Baltimore – WBFF 45
 Salisbury – WBOC-DT2 21.2

Massachusetts
 Boston – WFXT 25
 Springfield – WGGB-DT2 40.2

Michigan
 Alpena – WBKB-DT4 11.4
 Cadillac (Traverse City) – WFQX-TV 32
 Detroit – WJBK 2
 Flint – WSMH 66
 Grand Rapids – WXMI 17
 Lansing – WSYM-TV 47
 Marquette – WLUC-DT2 6.2
 Sault Ste. Marie – WWUP-DT2 10.2 (satellite of WFQX)
 Vanderbilt – WFUP-TV 45 (satellite of WFQX-TV)

Minnesota
 Duluth – KQDS-TV 21
 Mankato – KEYC-DT2 12.2
 Minneapolis-St. Paul – KMSP-TV 9
 Rochester – KXLT-TV 47
 Thief River Falls (Grand Forks, North Dakota) – KBRR 10 (satellite of KVRR, Fargo, N.D.)

Mississippi
 Greenwood – WABG-TV 6.2
 Gulfport (Biloxi) – WXXV-TV 25
 Hattiesburg – WHPM-LD 23
 Jackson – WDBD 40
 Meridian – WGBC-TV 30
 Natchez (Alexandria, Louisiana) – WNTZ-TV 48
 West Point (Tupelo) – WLOV-TV 27

Missouri
 Cape Girardeau (Paducah, Kentucky) – KBSI 23
 Columbia – KQFX-LD 22
 Kansas City – WDAF-TV 4
 Osage Beach (Springfield) – KRBK 49
 Saint Joseph – KNPN-LD 26
 St. Louis – KTVI 2

Montana
 Bozeman – KWYB-LD2 28.2 (simulcast of KWYB-DT2)
 Butte – KWYB-DT2 18.2
 Great Falls – KFBB-DT2 5.2
 Hardin (Billings) – KHMT 4
 Helena – KHBB-LD2 21.2
 Missoula – KTMF-DT2 23.2

Nebraska
 Hayes Center – KWNB-DT2 6.2 (simulcast of KFXL-TV)
 Kearney – KHGI-DT2 13.2 (simulcast of KFXL-TV)
 Lincoln – KFXL-TV 51
 North Platte – KIIT-CD 11 / KNOP-DT2 2.2
 Omaha – KPTM 42

Nevada
 Henderson (Las Vegas) – KVVU-TV 5
 Reno – KRXI-TV 11

New Hampshire
 None; served by WFXT Boston, WPFO Portland, ME and WFFF-TV Burlington, VT

New Jersey
 None; served by WNYW New York and WTXF-TV Philadelphia

New Mexico 
 Albuquerque – KRQE-DT2 13.2
 Roswell – KBIM-DT2 10.2 (satellite of KRQE-DT2)

New York
 Albany – WXXA-TV 23
 Binghamton – WICZ-TV 40
 Buffalo – WUTV 29
 Corning (Elmira) – WYDC 48
 New York City – WNYW 5
 Rochester – WUHF 31
 Syracuse – WSYT-TV 68
 Utica – WFXV 33
 Watertown – WNYF-CD 28 / WWNY-DT2 7.2

North Carolina
 Belmont (Charlotte) – WJZY 46
 Greenville – WYDO 14
 High Point (Greensboro) – WGHP 8
 Raleigh – WRAZ 50
 Wilmington – WSFX-TV 26

North Dakota
 Bismarck – KFYR-DT2 5.2
 Dickinson – KQCD-DT2 7.2 (satellite of KFYR-DT2)
 Fargo – KVRR 15
 Jamestown – KJRR 7 (satellite of KVRR)
 Minot – KMOT-DT2 10.2 (satellite of KFYR-DT2)
 Pembina (Winnipeg) – KNRR 12 (satellite of KVRR)
 Williston – KUMV-DT2 8.2 (satellite of KMOT-DT2)

Ohio
 Cincinnati (licensed in Newport – WXIX-TV 19)
 Cleveland – WJW-TV 8
 Columbus – WSYX 6.3
 Dayton – WKEF 22.2
 Lima – WLIO-DT2 8.2
 Steubenville (Wheeling, West Virginia) – WTOV-DT2 9.2
 Toledo – WUPW 36
 Youngstown – WYFX-LD 32
 Zanesville – WHIZ-DT2 18.2 (on 11/14/2022)

Oklahoma
 Oklahoma City – KOKH-TV 25
 Tulsa – KOKI-TV 23

Oregon
 Bend – KFXO-CD 39
 Eugene – KLSR-TV 34
 Medford – KMVU-DT 26
 Pendleton (Kennewick, Washington) – KFFX-TV 11
 Portland – KPTV 12

Pennsylvania
 Altoona – WATM-DT2 23.2 (simulcast of WWCP-TV)
 Erie – WFXP 66
 Hazleton (Scranton–Wilkes Barre) – WOLF-TV 56
 Johnstown – WWCP-TV 8
 Mercer – WFXI-CA 17 (repeater of WYFX-LP, Youngstown, Ohio)
 Philadelphia – WTXF-TV 29
 Pittsburgh – WPGH-TV 53
 York (Harrisburg) – WPMT 43

Rhode Island
 Providence – WNAC-TV 64

South Carolina
 Charleston – WTAT-TV 24
 Columbia – WACH 57
 Greenville – WHNS 21
 Hardeeville (Savannah, Georgia) – WTGS 28
 Myrtle Beach – WFXB 43

South Dakota
 Lead – KHSD-DT2 11.2 (satellite of KEVN-LD)
 Mitchell – KDLV-TV 5.2 (satellite of KDLT-TV)
 Rapid City – KEVN-LD 7
 Sioux Falls – KDLT-TV 46.2

Tennessee
 Chattanooga – WTVC-DT2 9.2
 Greeneville (Tri-Cities, TN–VA) – WEMT 39
 Jackson – WJKT 16
 Knoxville – WTNZ 43
 Memphis – WHBQ-TV 13
 Nashville – WZTV 17

Texas
 Abilene – KXVA 15
 Amarillo – KCIT 14
 Austin – KTBC 7
 Beaumont – KFDM 6.3
 Brownsville (Rio Grande Valley) – KXFX-CD 20 (satellite of KMBH-LD)
 Bryan – KYLE-DT2 28.2 (satellite of KWKT-TV)
 Corpus Christi – KSCC 38.1
 Dallas – KDFW 4
 El Paso – KFOX-TV 14
 Harlingen (Rio Grande Valley) – KFXV 60
 Houston – KRIV 26
 Laredo – KXOF-CD 31
 Longview (Tyler) – KFXK-TV 51 
 Lubbock – KJTV-TV 34
 McAllen (Rio Grande Valley) – KMBH-LD 67
 Odessa (Midland) – KPEJ-TV 24
 San Angelo – KIDY 6
 San Antonio – KABB 29
 Sherman – KXII-DT3 12.3
 Victoria – KVCT 19
 Waco – KWKT-TV 44
 Wichita Falls – KJTL 18

Utah
 Salt Lake City – KSTU 13

Vermont
 Burlington – WFFF-TV 44

Virginia
 Charlottesville – WCAV-DT2 27.1
 Harrisonburg – WSVF-CD 43
 Lynchburg – WWCW-DT2 21.2 (satellite of WFXR)
 Richmond – WRLH-TV 35
 Roanoke – WFXR 27
 Virginia Beach (Norfolk) – WVBT 43

Washington
 Spokane – KAYU-TV 28
 Tacoma (Seattle) – KCPQ 13
 Yakima – KCYU-LD 41 (satellite of KFFX-TV, Pendleton, Oregon)

West Virginia
 Charleston – WCHS-TV 8.2
 Clarksburg – WVFX 10
 Lewisburg (Bluefield) – WVNS-DT2 59.2
 Moorefield - W46BR-D 46 (satellite of WTTG Washington, D.C.)
 Parkersburg – WOVA-LD 22

Wisconsin
 Chippewa Falls (Eau Claire) – WEUX 48 (satellite of WLAX)
 Green Bay – WLUK-TV 11
 La Crosse – WLAX 25
 Madison – WMSN-TV 47
 Milwaukee – WITI 6
 Wausau – WZAW-LD 33 / WSAW-DT3 7.3

Wyoming 
Casper – KFNB 20
Cheyenne – KLWY 27
Lander (Riverton) – KFNE 10 (satellite of KFNB)
Rawlins – KFNR 11 (satellite of KFNB)

U.S. territories

Guam
 Dededo (Hagatna) – KEQI-LD 22
 Tamuning – KTGM-DT2 14.2 (simulcast of KEQI-LD)

Northern Mariana Islands
 Saipan - KPPI-LD2 7.2 (satellite of KEQI-LD)

Puerto Rico
 Aguadilla – WSJP-LD2 30.2
 San Juan - W20EJ-D 26.2
 Mayagüez - WOST/W27DZ-D 14.2
 Quebradillas - WWKQ-LD 14.2
 Ponce - WQQZ-CD 14.3

U.S. Virgin Islands
 Charlotte Amalie – WVXF-DT2 17.2

Fox channels outside the United States

Canada
While there are no Fox television affiliates in Canada, Canadians may be able to watch the Fox network from U.S.-based affiliates. Depending on the market, Canadian residents may have access to at least one U.S.-based Fox affiliate either through most cable and satellite providers in the country or via over-the-air digital television in border markets.

Mexico
While there are no Fox television affiliates in Mexico, Mexicans may be able to watch the Fox network from U.S.-based affiliates. Depending on the market, Mexican residents may have access to at least one U.S.-based Fox affiliate either through most cable and satellite providers in the country or via over-the-air digital television in border markets.

Other countries
These channels use the Fox brand but do not necessarily air all of the same programming as the U.S. network:
 Fox (Asia) – cable television channel
 Fox8 (Australia) – a cable television channel available through the Foxtel cable service
 Fox (Balkans) – cable television channel
 Fox (Bulgaria, Romania and Moldova) –  cable and satellite television channel
 Fox (Finland) – public cable television channel
 Fox (Germany) – cable television channel 
 Fox (Greece) and (Cyprus) – satellite television channel available through the NOVA Cyprus, Cablenet and CytaVision cable services
 Fox (Hungary) – television channel from Hungary, available through Telekom services, from February 1, Fox Hungary has a video-on-demand service called FOX+
 Fox (India) – cable television channel
 Fox (Italy) and (Malta) – a satellite television channel available through the SKY Italia satellite service
 Fox (Japan) – a cable television channel available through the SKY PerfecTV! cable service
 Fox (South Korea) –  cable television channel
 Canal Fox (Latin America) – cable television channel
 Fox (Middle East) – cable television channel
 Fox (Poland) – a cable television channel available through the Cyfrowy Polsat cable service
 Fox (Portugal) –  cable television channel
 Fox (Russia) –  cable and satellite television channel available to most subscribers of leading Russian satellite and cable operators
 Fox (Spain) and (Andorra) – a cable television channel available through the Digital+ cable service
 Fox (Taiwan) –  cable television channel
 Fox (Turkey) – a cable television channel available through the Cablecom cable service
 Fox (UK) and (Ireland) – a cable and satellite television channel

See also
 List of Fox television affiliates (table)
 List of former Fox television affiliates

References

External links
 Official Fox list of affiliates

Fox